David Evatt Tunley AM (born 1930) is an Australian musicologist and composer noted for his work on French music in the 17th and 18th centuries. He is currently Emeritus Professor at the School of Music, University of Western Australia in Perth.

Biography
David Evatt Tunley was born in 1930 in Australia. Tunley joined University of Western Australia in 1958 as the first full-time lecturer in Music. He was appointed to a Personal Chair in 1980 and to the Chair of Music in 1989.

As a scholar Tunley is internationally recognised as the leading authority on the 18th-century French cantata, and his book on the subject has become the classic study. His books and many articles as well as contributions to The New Grove Dictionary and the New Oxford History of Music, cover a wide range of research including French music from the 17th to 19th centuries, Australian and British music in the 20th century and aspects of music education.

The New York publisher Garland Press has issued 23 volumes of 18th and 19th century French vocal music, compiled and edited by Tunley. In 1983 he was made a Chevalier of the Ordre des Palmes Académiques for services to French music, and in 1987 became a member of the Order of Australia for services to music in his own country. He is a past national president of the Musicological Society of Australia, past chair of the Music Board of the Australia Council, and is a former federal chairperson of the Australian Music Examinations Board. He has been a research fellow at Christ Church and Wolfson Colleges in Oxford and at the Rockefeller Study Center at Bellagio in Italy.

Early in his career he received a French government scholarship to study composition with the celebrated French teacher Nadia Boulanger. He has created various community events in Perth and the surrounding areas such as the York Winter Music Festival which ran for ten years, and more recently the Terrace Proms. He was the founder conductor of the University Collegium Musicum whose annual Christmas concert is still one of the musical highlights of the year. Recognition of his work has come through the Australian Academy of the Humanities of which he became a fellow in 1980. He took early retirement in 1994 in order to devote himself more fully to his research and has been an honorary senior research fellow in music since this time. His most recent publications are 18th century French Cantata (2nd enlarged edition) in 1997 and The Bel Canto Violin: the life and times of Alfredo Campoli, 1906–1993 (1999).

In May 2010, Lecture Room G.05 in the School of Music at the University of Western Australia was renamed the Tunley Lecture Theatre in his honour.

References

1930 births
Living people
Australian musicologists
Chevaliers of the Ordre des Palmes Académiques